Sayyid Ahmed Abdallah Mohamed Sambi (born 5 June 1958) is a Comorian Islamic leader and politician, and former President of Comoros. He is popularly known as 'Ayatollah'. After easily winning the 14 May 2006 presidential election with 58.02% of the national vote, Sambi was inaugurated as President of the Union of the Comoros on 26 May 2006. It was the first peaceful transfer of power in the history of the Comoros.

Personal life
Sambi was born in Mutsamudu, on the island of Anjouan. He is a father of seven children including two named Intisware and Fatoumat. He owns factories which produce mattresses, bottled water and perfume - a key Comorian export. He lives above a shop called The House of Mattresses in Mutsamudu, the capital of Anjouan. He also set up a television station called Ulezi (education).

He is of Hadhrami ancestry, descending from the Ba 'Alawi family of Hadhramaut (now part of Yemen). Therefore, he is a descendant of Ali al-Uraidhi ibn Ja'far al-Sadiq and hence a Sayyid.

"The Ayatollah of Comoros"
He was educated in Islamic studies in Sudan, Saudi Arabia and Qom, Iran.  According to the Tehran-based Tabnak news agency, while Sambi was there he studied under Ayatollah Mesbah Yazdi.  Despite his Sunni background, Sambi's time in Iran and his penchant for turbans earned him the nickname "The Ayatollah of Comoros".

Political career
Running as an independent candidate in the 16 April 2006 presidential primary election on the island of Anjouan, Sambi placed first out of thirteen candidates, winning 23.70% of the vote.

In the 14 May election, Sambi was declared the victor on 15 May by Secretary of State for elections Ali Abdallah over retired French air force officer Mohamed Djaanfari and long-time politician Ibrahim Halidi, whose candidacy was backed by Azali Assoumani, the outgoing president.

Corruption charges

In 2018 Sambi was charged for planning the Comoros Passport scheme with Bashar Kiwan netting $200 million dollar from the UAE government.

In August 2018, Comoros authorities charged former president Ahmed Abdullah Sambi and Bachar Kiwan with corruption, embezzlement of public funds and forgery related to the sales of Comoros passports. Sambi was jailed, and in September 2018 appealed to the Supreme Court to be granted unrestricted access to his lawyer to defend himself in the corruption case.

From 21 to 24 November 2022, Ahmed Abdullah Sambi, Bashar Kiwan, Majd Suleiman, and other directors of Comoro Gulf Holdings, the company that allegedly facilitated the sales, were tried for high treason, embezzlement and money laundering of Comorian public funds allegedly diverted from the economic citizenship program. Prosecutors sought a life sentence for the former president and his accomplices. On 28 November 2022, Sambi was sentenced to life in prison.

Political views
Sambi has been quoted as saying that Comoros is not ready to become an Islamic state, nor will anyone be forced to wear a veil under his presidency. He also promised to fight corruption, create jobs and build better houses for the majority of Comorians living in poverty.

See also
Politics of the Comoros
Tokyo International Conference on African Development (TICAD-IV), 2008.
Ali al-Uraidhi ibn Ja'far al-Sadiq

References

External links 
 News and background information on Sambi Africa Intelligence.com

1958 births
Comorian people of Yemeni descent
Comorian Sunni Muslims
Hadhrami people
Living people
People from Anjouan
Presidents of the Comoros
Heads of government who were later imprisoned
Politicians convicted of embezzlement
People convicted of treason